This is a list of banks in the Czech Republic as of October 2018. The official list is maintained and updated by the Czech National Bank.

Central banks
 Czech National Bank

Commercial and Savings banks
  
 
 
 Česká spořitelna 
 Československá obchodní banka
  
 
 
 
 Komerční banka 
 Max banka
 
  
 
  
 PPF Banka
  
 
 
 
 UniCredit Bank Czech Republic and Slovakia

Branches of foreign banks 
 Bank Gutmann
 Bank of China (Hungary) 
 Bank of Communications 
 BNP Paribas Fortis 
 BNP Paribas Personal Finance
 Citibank Europe
 Commerzbank
 Deutsche Bank
 FCM Bank Limited
 HSBC Bank
 Inbank
 Industrial and Commercial Bank of China
 ING Bank
 mBank
 MUFG Bank (Europe) 
 Oberbank 
 Partner Bank
 Powszechna Kasa Oszczędności Bank Polski
  
 Saxo Bank
 Sumitomo Mitsui Banking Corporation Europe
 
 Všeobecná úverová banka
 Western Union International Bank

Defunct banks
 
 Anglo-Czechoslovak Bank
 Böhmische Escompte-Bank
 Böhmische Industriebank
 
 
 Equa bank
 ERB bank 
 Investiční a poštovní banka
 
 
 
 Wüstenrot hypoteční banka
 Zemská Banka
 Živnostenská Banka

References 

Czech Republic
 
Banks
Czech Republic